In baseball statistics, an error is an act, in the judgment of the official scorer, of a fielder misplaying a ball in a manner that allows a batter or baserunner to advance one or more bases or allows an at bat to continue after the batter should have been put out. An outfielder (OF) is a person playing in one of the three defensive positions in baseball farthest from the batter, who are identified as the left fielder (LF), the center fielder (CF), and the right fielder (RF). An outfielder's duty is to try to catch long fly balls before they hit the ground, or to quickly catch or retrieve and return to the infield any other balls entering the outfield. Outfielders normally play behind the six other members of the defense who play in or near the infield; unlike catchers and most infielders (excepting first basemen), who are virtually exclusively right-handed, outfielders can be either right- or left-handed. In the scoring system used to record defensive plays, the outfielders are assigned the numbers 7 (left field), 8 (center field) and 9 (right field).

The list of career leaders is dominated by players from the 19th century when fielding equipment was very rudimentary; baseball gloves only began to steadily gain acceptance in the 1880s, and were not uniformly worn until the mid-1890s, resulting in a much lower frequency of defensive miscues. The top 13 players in career errors began playing in the 19th century, most of them playing their entire careers before 1900; none of the 13 were active after 1905, and none of the top 29 were active after 1929. Most of the top 78 played entirely in the 19th century, with only four making their major league debut after 1920; only one was active after 1945. The top 42 single-season totals were all recorded before 1896, the top 100 were recorded before 1904, and the top 459 were recorded before 1937. To a large extent, the leaders reflect longevity rather than lower skill. Roberto Clemente, who became the first National League (NL) outfielder in over 40 years to commit 140 errors, won twelve Gold Glove Awards for defensive excellence.

Because game accounts and box scores often did not distinguish between the outfield positions, there has been some difficulty in determining precise defensive statistics prior to 1901; because of this, and because of the similarity in their roles, defensive statistics for the three positions are frequently combined. Tom Brown, who retired in 1898 after setting major league records for career games and assists as an outfielder, is the all-time leader in career errors committed by an outfielder with 492, more than twice as many as any outfielder who began playing after 1910; he is the only outfielder to be charged with more than 400 career errors. Dummy Hoy (394), Paul Hines (385), Jesse Burkett (383), George Gore (368), Jimmy Ryan (366), George Van Haltren (358), and Ned Hanlon (350) are the only other outfielders to commit more than 300 career errors. Justin Upton, who had 89 errors through the 2022 season to place him tied for 222nd all-time, is the leader among active players.

Key

List

Other Hall of Famers

References

Baseball-Reference.com

Major League Baseball statistics
Major League Baseball lists